Mbanza Congo Airport  is an airport serving M'banza Congo, the capital of Zaire Province in northwestern Angola. Passenger flights resumed in August 2017 following an eight-year gap, during which the airport was closed for construction works.

The Mbanza Congo non-directional beacon (Ident: SS) is located just northeast of the field.

History
The airport closed in 2009 for a refurbishment project and did not reopen to commercial air traffic until August 2017, when Sonair introduced domestic flights.

See also
 List of airports in Angola
 Transport in Angola

References

External links
 
 
OpenStreetMap - Mbanza Congo
OurAirports - Mbanza Congo

Mbanza